Anderson Tower, more commonly referred to as F-PAT or officially as F. Paul Anderson Tower, is a building at the University of Kentucky. The seven-level structure was completed in 1966 as Anderson Hall which replaced a former structure with the same name. It was named after F. Paul Anderson, the first dean of the College of Engineering. The structure, located in central campus in the engineering quadrangle, is connected to the Raymond Building and the Robotics Building. It is home to numerous classrooms, laboratories and offices related to the college.

See also
 Buildings at the University of Kentucky
 Cityscape of Lexington, Kentucky
 University of Kentucky

References

External links
 College of Engineering
 F. Paul Anderson Tower at University of Kentucky Campus Guide

Buildings at the University of Kentucky
University and college academic buildings in the United States
Buildings and structures completed in 1966